Vidisha Lok Sabha constituency is one of the 29 Lok Sabha constituencies in the Indian state of Madhya Pradesh. This constituency came into existence in 1967. This constituency covers parts of Raisen, Vidisha, Sehore and Dewas districts.

Vidhan Sabha segments
Presently, since the delimitation of the parliamentary and legislative assembly constituencies in 2008, Vidisha Lok Sabha constituency comprises the following eight Vidhan Sabha (Legislative Assembly) segments:

Members of Lok Sabha

 *By Poll in 1991 & 2006.

Election results

21st century

2019 results

2014 results

2009 results

2006 (by-election) results

2004 results

20th century

1999 results

1998 results

1996 results

1991 results

See also
 Vidisha district
 List of Constituencies of the Lok Sabha

References

Election Commission of India -http://www.eci.gov.in/StatisticalReports/ElectionStatistics.asp

Lok Sabha constituencies in Madhya Pradesh
Vidisha district